The Icon Towers are a complex of two residential towers in downtown Edmonton, Alberta, Canada.
Tower I was completed in 2009, and II was completed in 2010. In the podium, there is street front retail, along with offices in the other floors between the retail and condos.

The buildings are on the emerging trendy 104 Street "Fourth Street Promenade" north of Jasper Avenue.

Gallery

See also
List of tallest buildings in Edmonton

References

External links
The Icon

Skyscrapers in Edmonton
Twin towers
Residential skyscrapers in Canada
Towers in Alberta
Retail buildings in Canada
Skyscraper office buildings in Canada
Residential buildings completed in 2009
2009 establishments in Alberta